Aditi Sarangdhar is an Indian actress. She worked in many Marathi movies and series. She is famous for the role of Rama Chaudhary in serial Vadalvaat and Malvika Khanvilkar in serial Yeu Kashi Tashi Me Nandayla.

Early life 
Aditi was born to Dr. Dipak and Shaila Sarangdhar, a middle-class family from Kalyan. She is a graduate from Ramnarain Ruia College, Mumbai. On 25 May 2013, Aditi married Suhas Revandekar.

Career
Sarangdhar performed in Nishikant Kamat's experimental play Litmus, where she was spotted. Kanchan Adhikari offered her the role of Damini. She acted in the female version of Devendra Pem's EAll The Best' and then Zee Marathi's Vadalvaat.

In the two-act play, Aditi portrays call-girl "Shabbo". The story revolves around two characters and two incidents. She played shades of Radha successfully. Rajan Tamhane directed this play and played two short term characters. Aditi secured Zee Gaurav and MaTa Sanman for this role.

Hou De Jarasa Ushir is a movie directed by Wasim Maner. Aditi portrays Monali Mohite. The movie competed for an Oscar nomination.

Filmography

Films

Television

Stage work

Awards and nominations

References

External links
 Aditi Sarangdhar at IMDb

1981 births
Living people
Actresses from Mumbai
Marathi actors
Actresses in Marathi cinema
Actresses in Marathi television
Actresses in Marathi theatre
Indian television actresses
Indian film actresses
Indian stage actresses
21st-century Indian actresses